Paul Capdeville and Marcel Felder were the defending champions but Felder decided not to participate.
Capdeville played alongside Hans Podlipnik-Castillo, but they withdrawn after the first round.
Marcelo Demoliner and João Souza defeated James Cerretani and Pierre-Hugues Herbert 6–2, 4–6, [10–6] in the final to win the title.

Seeds

Draw

Draw

References
 Main Draw

IS Open de Tenis - Doubles
2013 Doubles